Captain Forrest Rosecrans "Tex" Biard (December 21, 1912 in Bonham, Texas – November 2, 2009) was an American linguist in the U.S. Navy codebreaking organization during the Second World War. A pre-war student of Japanese, Biard's translation work is considered to have been an important part of American military success.

Early life and education
Biard graduated from North Dallas High School in 1930 and from the United States Naval Academy in 1934. He served as an ensign on the heavy cruiser  from 1935 to 1937. Biard was sent to Tokyo in 1939 for full immersion Japanese language and culture training. His planned three-year assignment was cut short in September 1941 due to the rising tensions between Japan and the United States. Biard later earned a master's degree in physics from the Ohio State University in 1953.

World War II service
In September 1941, Biard (then a Lieutenant) was stationed at Pearl Harbor as a senior linguist for Station HYPO, part of American attempts to break Japanese military codes, including the key strategic code, JN-25. His translation and decryption work on JN-25 contributed substantially to Allied efforts in the Battle of the Coral Sea and the Battle of Midway. He was promoted to Lieutenant Commander on March 1, 1943.

Biard was promoted to Commander on February 1, 1944. He then worked with Tom Mackie to decrypt and translate captured Japanese Army code books for Douglas MacArthur; MacArthur was able to use Biard and Mackie's data to accelerate his "island-hopping" strategy to liberate New Guinea and hasten the end of the war.

Postwar career
In 1946, Biard served as Executive Officer in the Intelligence Division and Chief of the Security Section for Operation Crossroads, the first nuclear weapons tests conducted by Joint Army/Navy Task Force One at Bikini Atoll.

Biard retired from the U.S. Navy in January 1955 and received a promotion to Captain based on his wartime service record. After retirement, he taught Physics at Long Beach City College.

Biard was interred along with his wife Winifred in Arlington National Cemetery on January 20, 2010.

Notes

References 

 Layton, Rear Admiral Edwin T., U.S.N. (Ret.), with Captain Roger Pineau, U.S.N.R. (Ret.). and John Costello, “And I Was There” - Pearl Harbor and Midway – Breaking the Secrets, William Morrow and Company Inc., New York (1985) at 51, 470. Regarding the accomplishments of the Station Hypo codebreaking group, Adm. Nimitz "enthusiastically endorsed" the following statement issued by then-Capt. Jasper Holmes in a postwar assessment report (which was not declassified until 1984): "The fate of the nation quite literally depended upon about a dozen men who had devoted their lives and their careers, in peace and war, to radio intelligence" at 470.
 Kahn, David, The Codebreakers, The MacMillan Company – New York (1967) at 38.
Dear, I.C.B., and Foot, M.R.D. (Eds.), The Oxford Companion To World War II, Oxford University Press, Oxford, New York (1995) at 796, 1174.

External links
Transcript of a 2002 speech by Biard
USS Johnston profile of Biard

1912 births
2009 deaths
People from Bonham, Texas
Military personnel from Dallas
United States Naval Academy alumni
United States Navy officers
American cryptographers
Pre-computer cryptographers
United States Navy personnel of World War II
Ohio State University Graduate School alumni
Long Beach City College faculty
Burials at Arlington National Cemetery